Sir Cecil Denny, 6th Baronet (14 December 1850 – 24 August 1928), was born in Hampshire, England, as one of the Denny baronets of Tralee Castle. He moved to Edmonton, Alberta, Canada, and worked as a police officer, Indian agent, and author.

References

1850 births
1928 deaths
People from Hampshire (before 1974)
Baronets in the Baronetage of Ireland
English emigrants to pre-Confederation Canada